Patrick Desmond Fitzgerald Murray DSc FAA (1900–1967), also known as P. D. F. Murray, was an English-born Australian zoologist.

References

Fellows of the Australian Academy of Science
1900 births
1967 deaths
20th-century Australian zoologists